Tranquerah Mosque is a mosque in Malacca City, Malacca, Malaysia. It was built in 1728 and located next to tomb of Sultan Hussein Shah of Johor and used to be the state mosque of Malacca before the establishment of Al Azim Mosque in 1990.

The original mosque structure was made entirely of timber bought from Kalimantan, Dutch East India Company. It had since undergone several renovations and restorations. The mosque consists of Javanese culture components. It features triple-tiered pyramidal roof and a square base. It is one of the few mosque in Malaysia which has a pagoda in place of a minaret. The interior is a mixture of Malay, Chinese and Indonesian elements.

See also
 Islam in Malaysia

References

Mosques in Malacca
Mosques completed in 1728
1728 establishments in Asia
1728 establishments in the Dutch Empire